Mount Mary Austin is a mountain east of the Sierra Crest and west of Independence, California. It is named in honor of Mary Hunter Austin, the author of The Land of Little Rain and natural historian who lived in Independence. 

The mountain is located in the John Muir Wilderness. Special permits to enter this area have been required in the past since it is habitat for the Sierra Nevada bighorn sheep, an endangered species. The United States Forest Service does not advise the use of pack goats in this area.

References

External links
 

Mountains of the John Muir Wilderness
Mountains of Inyo County, California
Mountains of Northern California